Carlos Oquendo de Amat (April 17, 1905 – March 6, 1936) was a Peruvian poet born in Moho, generally recognized by his only book of poetry 5 Meters of Poems, first published on 1927, which is an accordion book or pop-up book which extends to approximately 5 meters in length when fully opened. In the words of Urayoán Noel "5 Meters of Poems is a joy to read, and a significant contribution to our understanding of Latin American vanguard poetry beyond such canonical figures as Neruda and Vallejo. Here’s hoping for many more meters!".

Works
5 Metros de Poemas, Editorial Minerva, Lima: 1927 (first edition).
Five Meters of Poems, translated by David M. Guss with woodcuts by Antonio Frasconi, Turkey Press, Isla Vista, California, 1986.
5 Metros de Poemas, Ediciones El Taller del Libro, Madrid: 2004. 
5 metros de Poemas / 5 Metros de Poesie, translated by Riccardo Badini, In Forma di Parole poetry review, Italy, 2002.
5 Meters of Poems, Spanish-English bilingual edition, translated by Joshua Beckman and Alejandro de Acosta, Ugly Duckling Presse, Brooklyn, New York, 2010.

External links
Biography and photography of the author and info about the Ugly Duckling Presse edition
Info about the Turkey Press edition
Review of the 2010 USA edition by Urayoán Noel
Latin American Poetry class at Brown University creates tribute video for 5 Meters of Poems
About the 2004 Spanish edition
About the Italian edition (in Spanish)

20th-century Peruvian poets
1905 births
1936 deaths
Peruvian male poets
20th-century male writers